Euseius sakagamii is a species of mite in the family Phytoseiidae.

References

sakagamii
Articles created by Qbugbot
Animals described in 1966